If Only may refer to:
If Only (film), a 2004 film directed by Gil Junger
If Only (TV series), an Armenian TV series
If Only (book), Geri Halliwell's 1999 autobiography
"If Only" (Dove Cameron song), 2015
"If Only" (KT Tunstall song), 2008
"If Only" (Hanson song), 2000
"If Only", song from Away from the World by Dave Matthews Band
"If Only", song from Popstar: A Dream Come True by Sarah Geronimo
"If Only", song from Whistle Down the Wind by Andrew Lloyd Webber
"If Only", song from Kiss Me Once by Kylie Minogue
"If Only", song from Feeling the Space by Yoko Ono
"If Only", song from Two by the Calling
"If Only", song from Gouldian Finch Vol. 2 by San Holo (featuring Eastghost, Analogue Dear, Taska Black, Droeloe, Losi, ILIVEHERE., and GOSLO)
"If Only", song from Sì by Andrea Bocelli featuring Dua Lipa
"If Only", song from The Color of Silence by Tiffany
"If Only", song from When in Rome by When in Rome
"If Only", song from Queens of the Stone Age by Queens of the Stone Age
"If Only", a B-side to the song "Like a Rose" by A1

See also
Verb tense usage after if only